The American Athletic Conference Women's Basketball Player of the Year is a basketball award given to the American Athletic Conference's most outstanding player, as chosen by the league's head coaches. The conference formed in 2013–14 after many schools departed from the original Big East Conference to form a new Big East Conference.

The first seven awards were claimed by players from UConn, which left after the 2019–20 season to join the current Big East, having won every conference game in both regular-season and tournament play during its American tenure. Breanna Stewart won the first three awards in 2014, 2015, and 2016. The following season saw the first-ever shared award, with Napheesa Collier and Katie Lou Samuelson sharing honors. Each would win the award once more as an individual.

Key

Winners

Winners by school

References

NCAA Division I women's basketball conference players of the year
Player Of The Year
Awards established in 2014
2014 establishments in the United States